Ramzi Garmou (born in Zakho, Iraq on 5 February 1945), is the Assyro-Chaldean Catholic archbishop of Tehran on the Assyro-Chaldean Catholic Metropolitan Archdiocese of Tehran.

Garmou was consecrated a priest on 13 January 1977 and joined the Eparchy of Tehran. On  5 May 1995, he was appointed by Pope John Paul II as co-adjutor bishop of Tehran. His episcopal ordination was on the hands of The Chaldean Patriarch of Babylon Raphael I Bidawid aided by Archbishop of Tehran, Youhannan Semaan Issayi and by the Archbishop of Urmia Thomas Meram on 25 February 1996.

On 7 February 1999, Ramzi Garmou succeeded Youhannan Semaan Issayi as Assyro-Chaldean Archbishop of Tehran upon the latter's death.

In 2019, he became Archbishop of Diarbekir (Amida) (Chaldean), Turkey. He lives in Istanbul.

References

External links

Chaldean archbishops
1945 births
Living people
People from Zakho
Iraqi Assyrian people
Iranian bishops
Iranian Assyrian people
Iraqi emigrants to Iran